The Scottish Vowel Length Rule (also known as Aitken's law after A. J. Aitken, the Scottish linguist who formulated it) describes how vowel length in Scots, Scottish English, and, to some extent, Ulster English and Geordie is conditioned by the phonetic environment of the target vowel. Primarily, the rule is that certain vowels (described below) are phonetically long in the following environments:
Before .
Before a voiced fricative.
Before a morpheme boundary.
In a word-final open syllable, save for the  vowel  (or, in Geordie).
Exceptions can also exist for particular vowel phonemes, dialects, words, etc., some of which is discussed in greater detail below.

Phonemes 

The underlying phonemes of the Scottish vowel system (that is, in both Scottish Standard English dialects and Scots dialects) are as follows:

★ = Vowels that definitively follow the Scottish Vowel Length Rule.

Rule specifics and exceptions 

The further north a Scots dialect is from central Scotland, the more it will contain specific words that do not adhere to the rule.

 In stressed syllables before voiced fricatives, namely , and also before . In Shetland dialect the  realisation of underlying , usual in other Scots varieties, remains a long environment.
 Before another vowel and
 Before a morpheme boundary so, for example, "stayed"  is pronounced with a longer vowel than "staid" .
  (vowel 12) usually occurs in all environments in final stressed syllables. 
 Vowel 8a, which only occurs stem-finally, and vowel 10 are always short; therefore, vowel 1 in its short form (according to the Rule), vowel 8a, and vowel 10 all merge as the diphthong .

History 

The Scottish Vowel Length Rule is assumed to have come into being between the early Middle Scots and late Middle Scots periods.

References 

Scottish English
Phonology
Scots language
Vowels
Vowel shifts